Tim O'Brien (born October 1, 1946) is an American novelist who served as a soldier in the Vietnam War. Much of his writing is about wartime Vietnam, and his later work often explores the postwar lives of its veterans.

O’Brien is perhaps best known for his book The Things They Carried (1990), a collection of linked semi-autobiographical stories inspired by O'Brien's wartime experiences. In 2010, The New York Times described the latter as “
a classic of contemporary war fiction.” In addition, O’Brien is acclaimed for his war novel, Going After Cacciato (1978),
which received the National Book Award. 

Although generally known as a Vietnam War writer, O'Brien is also an esteemed teacher and creative writing instructor who held the endowed chair at the MFA program of Texas State University–San Marcos every other academic year from 2003 to 2012.

Biography

Early life
Tim O'Brien was born in Austin, Minnesota on October
1, 1946, the son of William Timothy O'Brien and Ava Eleanor Schultz O'Brien. When he was ten, his family, including a younger brother and sister, moved to Worthington, Minnesota. Worthington had a large influence on O’Brien's imagination and his early development as an author. The town is on Lake Okabena in the southwestern part of the state and serves as the setting for some of his stories, especially those in The Things They Carried.

Military service
O'Brien earned his BA in 1968 in political science from Macalester College, where he was student body president. That same year he was drafted into the United States Army and was sent to Vietnam, where he served from 1969 to 1970 in 3rd Platoon, Company A, 5th Battalion, 46th Infantry Regiment, part of the 23rd Infantry Division (the Americal Division) that contained the unit that perpetrated the My Lai Massacre the year before his arrival. O'Brien has said that when his unit got to the area around My Lai (referred to as "Pinkville" by the U.S. forces), "we all wondered why the place was so hostile. We did not know there had been a massacre there a year earlier. The news about that only came out later, while we were there, and then we knew."

First book published
Upon completing his tour of duty, O'Brien went to graduate school at Harvard University. Afterward he received an internship at the Washington Post. In 1973 he published his first book, a memoir, If I Die in a Combat Zone, Box Me Up and Ship Me Home, about his war experiences. In this memoir, O'Brien writes: "Can the foot soldier teach anything important about war, merely for having been there? I think not. He can tell war stories."

Personal life
O’Brien writes and lives in central Texas. He is raising a family and teaches full-time every other year at Texas State University–San Marcos. In alternate years, he teaches several workshops to MFA students in the creative writing program.

O'Brien's papers are housed at the Harry Ransom Center at the University of Texas at Austin.

Writing style

In the story "Good Form" from his novel The Things They Carried, O'Brien discusses the distinction between "story-truth" (the truth of fiction) and "happening-truth" (the truth of fact or occurrence), writing that "story-truth is sometimes truer than happening-truth." O’Brien suggests that story truth is emotional truth. In turn, the emotions created by a fictional story are sometimes truer than what results from only reading the facts.

This demonstrates one aspect of O’Brien’s writing style: a blurring of the usual distinction we make between fiction and reality. O’Brien will use details from his own life, but frame them in a self-conscious or metafictional narrative voice. 

By the same token, certain sets of stories in The Things They Carried seem to contradict each other, and certain stories are designed to "undo" the suspension of disbelief created in previous stories. For example, "Speaking of Courage" is followed by "Notes", which explains in what ways "Speaking of Courage" is fictional. This is another example of how O’Brien will blur the traditional distinctions we make between fact and fiction.

Personal views on the Vietnam War
While O'Brien does not consider himself a spokesman for the Vietnam War, he has occasionally commented on it. Speaking years later about his upbringing and the war, O'Brien described his hometown as "a town that congratulates itself, day after day, on its own ignorance of the world: a town that got us into Vietnam. Uh, the people in that town sent me to that war, you know, couldn't spell the word 'Hanoi' if you spotted them three vowels."

Contrasting the continuing American search for U.S. MIA/POWs in Vietnam with the reality of the high number of Vietnamese war dead, he describes the American perspective as 
A perverse and outrageous double standard. What if things were reversed? What if the Vietnamese were to ask us, or to require us, to locate and identify each of their own MIAs? Numbers alone make it impossible: 100,000 is a conservative estimate. Maybe double that. Maybe triple. From my own sliver of experience—one year at war, one set of eyes—I can testify to the lasting anonymity of a great many Vietnamese dead.

O'Brien was interviewed for Vietnam: The Ten Thousand Day War as well as Ken Burns's 2017 documentary series The Vietnam War.

Awards and honors
If I Die in a Combat Zone, Box Me Up and Ship Me Home was named Outstanding Book of 1973 by the New York Times.  
O'Brien won the 1979 National Book Award for his novel Going After Cacciato. 
O'Brien received the Vietnam Veterans of America Excellence in the Arts Award in 1987 
His novel In the Lake of the Woods won the James Fenimore Cooper Prize for Best Historical Fiction in 1995. 
In August 2012, O'Brien received the Dayton Literary Peace Prize Foundation's Richard C. Holbrooke Distinguished Achievement Award. In June 2013, O'Brien was awarded the $100,000 Pritzker Military Library Literature Award.
In 2010, O'Brien received the honorary Doctor of Humane Letters (L.H.D.) from Whittier College.

Selected bibliography

Fiction
Novels
 Northern Lights (1975) 
 Going After Cacciato (1978) 
 The Nuclear Age (1985) 
 The Things They Carried (1990) 
 In the Lake of the Woods (1994) 
 Tomcat in Love (1998) 
 July, July (2002) 
 America Fantastica (2023)  - forthcoming

Memoirs
 If I Die in a Combat Zone, Box Me Up and Ship Me Home (1973) 
Dad's Maybe Book (2019)

Other works
 "Where Have You Gone, Charming Billy?" (1975) - short story

References

External links

  A Crisis 'In Country': An Ecocritical Approach to Tim O'Brien's Fiction, Rosalind Poppleton, University of Hertfordshire, British Library (2000)
 "Tim O'Brien video interview" (2010), on Big Think
 Online discussion of The Things They Carried, Book Talk
 Tim O'Brien Papers at the Harry Ransom Center, University of Texas at Austin
 Tim O'Brien, at Writers Reflect, Ransom Center
 Participation in Pritzker Military Museum & Library's Military History Symposium
 Tim O'Brien at Library of Congress Authorities — with 19 catalog records
 
 "How To Tell a True War Story" BBC TV Documentary, 1992

1946 births
Living people
20th-century American novelists
21st-century American novelists
American male novelists
American memoirists
United States Army personnel of the Vietnam War
Harvard University alumni
James Fenimore Cooper Prize winners
Macalester College alumni
National Book Award winners
People from Austin, Minnesota
People from Worthington, Minnesota
Postmodern writers
Texas State University faculty
United States Army non-commissioned officers
Novelists from Minnesota
Novelists from Texas
21st-century American non-fiction writers
American male non-fiction writers
20th-century American male writers
21st-century American male writers